The IMR-2 is a Soviet and Russian tracked military engineering vehicle built on T-72 main battle tank chassis. IMR stands for Inzhenernaya Mashina Razgrazhdeniya, meaning "Clearing Engineering Vehicle".

Development of the IMR-2 begun in 1970s and completed in 1980, while commercial production commenced in 1982. IMR-2 developed to replace aging IMR which built on the basis of T-54/55 tank. The IMR-2 combat engineering vehicle is in service with Russian Army and some foreign militaries. It took part in Soviet-Afghan War, First Chechen War, Second Chechen War, Russian invasion of Ukraine and was in addition used in relief operations after  Chernobyl disaster.

Design
IMR-2  was derived from the T-72 tank. The turret of the T-72 was replaced with a new rotating multipurpose telescopic crane. The IMR-2 has a bulldozer blade fitted on the front of the hull, which has a V shape and a straight shape and a 200 – 250 m3/h capacity. When not required, the blade is folded upwards. Stone barriers can be cleared at the rate of 280 to 350 meter an hour while trenches and tree barriers can be filled in at the rate of 350 to 400 m3/h.
A 12.7 mm NSVT machine gun is mounted on the crew operator/commander cabin, for the self-protection of the vehicle.

Propulsion
The IMR-2 is powered by a multi-fuel water-cooled diesel engine V-84Ms developing 840 hp, the same engine used in the T-72. The IMR-2 can run at a maximum road speed of 50 km/h with a maximum range of 500 km. The IMR-2 uses the same torsion bar suspension as the main battle tank T-72, which consists of six road wheels on each side.
This combat engineering vehicle is operated by a 2-man crew.

Variants

IMR: First version of combat engineering vehicle built on T-54/55 medium battle tank chassis, powered by a V-55 diesel engine developing 520 hp.
IMR-2M1: Simplified model without the mine-clearing system. Entered service in 1982. Based on T-72A tank hull.
IMR-2M2: Improved version that is better suited for operations in dangerous situations, for example in contaminated areas. It entered service in 1990 and has a modified crane arm with bucket instead off the pincers.
IMR-2MA: Latest version with bigger operator's cabin armed with a 12.7 mm machine gun NSV.
Klin-1: Remote controlled IMR-2.
IMR-3M: Combat engineering vehicle built on the T-90 main battle tank chassis. The vehicle is 9,320 mm long, 3,500 mm wide and 3,430 mm high and weighs 49.5 t with the KMT-RZ minesweeping device. The IMR-3M is powered by an 840-hp V-84MS multifuel diesel engine, producing a maximum speed of 60 km/h and a range of 500 km. The baseline AEV is fitted with a U-type dozer blade, jib-type crane with an excavator bucket, and minesweeping plow. A chemical, biological, radiological and nuclear [CBRN] reconnaissance device, smokescreen generator, advanced signal suite and automatic fire extinguisher are fitted. The IMR-3M is armed with an NSVT 12.7 mm heavy machinegun [HMG] in a remotely controlled station. Production started in 2016 and is currently ongoing. IMR-3M is capable of fording water barriers up to 5 m deep along the bottom.

References

Military engineering vehicles of the Soviet Union
Omsktransmash products
Military vehicles introduced in the 1980s